The Fine Arts Museum of Nantes, along with 14 other provincial museums, was created, by consular decree on 14 Fructidor in year IX (31 August 1801). Today the museum is one of the largest museums in the region.

The facades, roof and stairs in the building that houses the art collections have been registered as historical monuments since 29 October 1975.

On 18 December 2011 the museum closed its doors for what was initially expected to be two years at most, to carry out extension expansion work. Due to problems associate with the discovery of ground water in the foundations, which required almost four years of additional work, the reopening of the entire building (renamed the "Art Museum of Nantes") was postponed until 23 June 2013.

Overview 
Founded under the Consulate by Napoléon Bonaparte, the Fine Arts Museum of Nantes receives work purchased by state and the central museum deposits (the Louvre). It takes from the 19th century where it was an important place in the French public collections through the purchase by the city of Nantes in the collection of the brothers Pierre and François Cacault. The fund, with major works, were later supplemented by several other direct or law given gifts, and a purchasing policy supported by the friends of the museum. Compounding this today adds to this rich set of deposits of work of the Regional Contemporary Art Funds of the Loire and the Centre Pompidou.

The museum offers an overview of all the main French and European art movements, which places its collections among the largest public collections of province alongside some of Museums of Fine Arts of Valenciennes, Grenoble, Lyon, Lille and Montpellier.

Origins 
It benefits in 1804 and 1809 to send to the state of 43 paintings taken from the reserves of the Central Museum. These works came from the former royal collection, from churches and convents of Paris of the revolutionary and Napoleonic conquests. But it is the purchase of the collection by the Cacault brothers by the city in 1810 that gives the museum of Nantes its riches and variety. According to an inventory conducted in 1818, the collection Cacault was then the richest collections of painting that existed outside of Paris, since it had 1,155 paintings, 64 sculptures, and 134 collections of prints.

It was not until 1830 that the collections were presented to the public on the floor of the hall with paintings (located on the street of Feltre to the sight of the old market of Feltre) This space quickly proved to be too small. In 1891, the city decided to build a designed to preserve and present them to the public in good conditions. A square plot near the school and the botanical garden, is chosen to host the future Palace of Fine Arts. The project was in the public competition as the  “museum of paintings and sculptures.”

Architecture

Building from 1893 
 The winner, the original Nantes architect Clement-Marie Josso, designed the plans for Palace of Fine Arts according to the principles of recent museums of Lille and Amiens. The plan was organized around a central courtyard covered with a glass roof. A dual circuit galleries and room surrounded it on two levels behind a monumental double staircase and a vaulted vestibule. The rooms on the bottom floor are lit by large windows, those on the floor have a modern overhead lighting made possible by the metal frame of the whole.

The architectural eclecticism meets the triumph of architects at the Universal Exhibition of 1900 (inauguration year of the museum) and take their revenge on the engineers of the 1889. The small hole between the Ionic columns hold art allegories and architecture in the middle on top of the entry door.

This monument of the late 19th century, the museum was able to fit the chronological presentation of enriched collections. Meanwhile, an ambitious temporary exhibition allows the spread of heritage and contemporary creation.

Future Museum of Arts 
In 2011, the museum was closed for a maximum of 2 years to make major expansion work to increase its area to 17,000 m2, versus 11,400 m2, and to enclosed the chapel of the Oratory (serving as a place of temporary exhibitions for the museum) nearby, constructing new buildings according to the plans of the architect, British Stanton Williams, instead of commercial constructions. This work includes: the expansion of 2,500 m2 for exhibition area (mainly dedicated to contemporary art), the development of an auditorium of 180 seats in the patio, improving access to the entire building, the glass roofs have been completely renovated, with the aim of using natural light; and the reception staff to more appropriate premises. However, the discovery of significant water pipes at the construction site delayed progress, forcing architects to change their plans and adding an additional cost of 10 million euros. For all the exhibition spaces, reopening of the museum will finally take place in December 2016, after 3 years of delay while the former work schedule planned to reopen in two phases: 2016 and 2018 extension for the historic building.

As a result of the transformation of the urban community in the metropolis, the museum became the Metropolitan on 1 January 2015.

During Jules Dupré 
Location: 47 ° 13 '10 "N 1 ° 32' 52" W

Jules-Dupré course is a paved road that connects Georges Clemenceau St. to Gambetta St. along the west side of the museum. The entry is from the beginning, limited by gates at each end to allow exclusive use by the museum.

Its name, decided in 1899, is a tribute to the painter Jules Dupré (1811-1889.)

The boundary of the protected area of Nantes goes through the middle of the road. The Fine Arts Museum is not part of the protected area

Collection 
The museum gives access to an online collections

Artworks in the collection  include paintings from the 13th century to modern art by painter such as:

Ancient painting (13th century to 18th century)

 Abraham Bloemaert
 Ambrogio Borgognone
 Jan Brueghel the Elder
 Philippe de Champaigne
 Pieter Claesz
 Bernardo Daddi
 Orazio Gentileschi
 Luca Giordano
 Gerard van Honthorst
 Charles de La Fosse
 Georges de La Tour: 3 paintings
 Peter Lely
 Giovanni Battista Moroni
 Perugino
 Guido Reni
 Peter Paul Rubens
 Andrea Solario
 Tintoretto
 Cosme Tura
 Virginia Vezzi
 Simon Vouet
 Antoine Watteau

19th-century and 20th-century painting and sculpture

 Jules Benoit-Lévy
 Eugène Boudin
 Edward Burne-Jones
 Camille Corot
 Courbet: The Wheat Sifters
 Édouard Joseph Dantan
 Delacroix
 Sonia Delaunay
 Maurice Denis
 Kees van Dongen
 Jean Dubuffet
 Georges Dufrénoy
 Raoul Dufy
 Max Ernst
 Jean Auguste Dominique Ingres
 Wassily Kandinsky: 11 paintings including Herunter
 Fernand Léger
 Albert Marquet
 Claude Monet
 Giuseppe Penone
 Pablo Picasso
 Pierre-Auguste Renoir
 Théodore Rousseau
 Georges Seurat
 Paul Signac
 Alfred Sisley
 Horace Vernet
 Herbert Ward

Gallery

References 

1801 establishments in France
Art museums established in 1801
Art museums and galleries in France
Arts